Ross King (born 16 August 1993) is an Irish hurler who plays for Laois Senior Championship club Rathdowney–Errill and at inter-county level with the Laois senior hurling team. He usually lines out as a left corner-forward.

Career

King first came to prominence as a member of the Rathdowney–Errill club at juvenile and underage levels. He eventually joined the club's senior team and has since won County Championship titles in 2012, 2014 and 2019. He simultaneously played with University College Dublin in the Fitzgibbon Cup, having earlier won a Collingwood Cup medal as a soccer player. King made his first appearances at inter-county level during a three-year stint with the Laois under-21 team. He joined the Laois senior hurling team in 2014 and was at corner-forward when Laois secured the 2019 Joe McDonagh Cup title.

Career statistics

Honours

University College Dublin
Collingwood Cup: 2012

Rathdowney-Errill
Laois Senior Hurling Championship: 2012, 2014, 2019

Laois
Joe McDonagh Cup: 2019

References

External links
Ross King profile at the UCD A.F.C. website
Ross King profile at the Laois GAA website

1993 births
Living people
Rathdowney-Errill hurlers
UCD hurlers
Laois inter-county hurlers